The First Street Bridge is a stone arch bridge in Merrill, Wisconsin, which carries First Street across the Prairie River. Each arch is bordered by an alternating pattern of single and double stones and is capped by  keystones. Contractor Fred Hesterman built the bridge in 1904, replacing an existing bridge. The bridge is the only known three stone arch bridge in Wisconsin.

The bridge was added to the National Register of Historic Places on September 12, 1996.

References

Road bridges on the National Register of Historic Places in Wisconsin
Bridges completed in 1904
Buildings and structures in Lincoln County, Wisconsin
National Register of Historic Places in Lincoln County, Wisconsin
Stone arch bridges in the United States